The March 76A was an open-wheel formula racing car, designed, developed and built by British manufacturer and constructor, March Engineering, for Formula 5000 racing, in 1976. It won a single race in 1976, with Alan Jones at Watkins Glen. It was powered by the commonly used Chevrolet small-block engine. After its Formula 5000 career and use, it was converted into a closed-wheel sports prototype, where it was used in the revived Can-Am series. Its best result was a 5th-place finish.

References

March vehicles
Formula 5000 cars